EKY may refer to:

 Eastern Kentucky
 Bessemer Airport (EKY is the FAA location identifier.)